Kinesin-like protein KIF2A is a protein that in humans is encoded by the KIF2A gene.

Kinesins, such as KIF2, are microtubule-associated motor proteins. For background information on kinesins, see MIM 148760.[supplied by OMIM]

References

Further reading

External links 
 

Human proteins
Human genes
Motor proteins